Gourdon railway station served the village of Gourdon, Aberdeenshire, Scotland from 1865 to 1951 on the Montrose and Bervie Railway.

History 
The station opened on 1 November 1865 by the Scottish North Eastern Railway. It closed to both passengers and goods traffic on 1 October 1951.

References

External links 

Disused railway stations in Aberdeenshire
Former North British Railway stations
Railway stations in Great Britain opened in 1865
Railway stations in Great Britain closed in 1951
1865 establishments in Scotland
1951 disestablishments in Scotland